The National War Memorial is a monument on the north edge of the city centre of Adelaide, South Australia, commemorating those who served in the First World War. Opened in 1931, the memorial is located on the corner of North Terrace and Kintore Avenue, adjacent to the grounds of Government House. Memorial services are held at the site throughout the year, with major services on both Anzac Day (25 April) and Remembrance Day (11 November).

First proposed in 1919, the memorial was funded by the Parliament of South Australia, making it the first Australian state war memorial to be confirmed after the war. The design of the memorial was selected through two architectural competitions. The first competition, in 1924, produced 26 designs—all of which were lost before judging could be completed after fire destroyed the building in which they were housed. A second competition, in 1926, produced 18 entries, out of which the design by the architectural firm Woods, Bagot, Jory & Laybourne-Smith was selected as the winner.

The design—effectively a frame for two scenes depicted through Rayner Hoff's marble reliefs and bronze statues—shows the prelude and the epilogue to war, depicting both the willingness of youth to answer the call of duty and the extent of the sacrifices which they made. In this, the work is not displaying a material victory, but instead a victory of the spirit. At the insistence of W. F. J. McCann, president of the Returned Soldiers' League, bronze tablets were cast to line the walls of an inner shrine, on which are listed the names of all South Australians who died during the Great War.

History

Almost 35,000 South Australians served in the First World War. This number amounted to 8.5% of the South Australian population at the time, or 37.7% of men between the ages of 18 and 44. Of those who served, over 5,000 South Australians died. In response to these deaths, Archibald Peake, the premier of South Australia, asked the state parliament to fund a memorial commemorating the victory and the sacrifice of those who had fought and fallen. The motion was presented in March 1919, and it received unanimous support in the House of Assembly and the Legislative Council. With the passing of this motion, the South Australian Government became the first in Australia to elect to build a memorial to the soldiers of the First World War.

It was decided by parliament that the new memorial should be referred to as the "National War Memorial", even though it was to be a purely South Australian monument, and in spite of the term already being used to describe the memorial to the South African War of 1899–1902. There have been at least two perspectives offered as to why the term National was employed. First, as Donald Richardson observed, the name may have been chosen to emphasise the government's intention that the memorial should commemorate all who served during the war, not just those who came from South Australia; and second, Ken Inglis argued that the name may have reflected the perception (still held in spite of federation) that the "province is a nation".

1924 competition
The National War Memorial Committee was formed in order to bring the proposal to fruition, and in February 1924 the committee announced an architectural competition to find the design of the new memorial. In the preamble to the conditions of entry, it was stated that the new memorial was to serve the purpose of "perpetually commemorating the Victory achieved in the Great War, 1914–1918, the Supreme and personal sacrifice of those who participated in that War, and the National effort involved in such activities".

Entry was open to South Australians who were British subjects, and those intending to submit designs were required to file a statement of intent prior to 29 February 1924. The competition closed on 30 September 1924, and there was a one-guinea entry fee. Three assessors were nominated to judge the entries: the South Australian Architect-in-Chief, A. E. Simpson; local architect Herbert Louis Jackman (representing the South Australian Institute of Architects); and Sir William Sowden.

The committee specified a budget of £25,000 (previously figures of both £5,000 and £100,000 had been discussed), and the conditions of entry stated that the memorial was to be situated at the entrance to Government House on the corner of King William Street and North Terrace, placing it just behind the existing memorial to the South African War. This location was counter to previous suggestions: a 1919 survey of architects had proposed that the memorial should be built on Montefiore Hill, while in 1923 the plans for the memorial involved erecting it at the rear of Government House, rather than at the front.

The committee left open the form that the memorial would take, beyond stating that the memorial was not to be "utilitarian in character", and debate over the form led to the emergence of a number of suggestions, many of which were covered in the media of the day. These included Dame Nellie Melba's proposal to build a carillon of bells; a suggestion by Simpson Newland to turn Anzac Highway into a "Way of Honour" by adding triumphal arches to each end; and Walter Charles Torode's plan to build a  "metal and marble" monument on the top of Mount Lofty with an electric car to carry people to the summit.

In the end a total of 28 architectural firms registered their intent to submit entries to the competition—a lower number than expected, but Richardson suggests this may have been due to work on proposals for the new Adelaide railway station. Out of those 28, a total of 26 firms submitted designs by the deadline. On 10 November 1924, before judging could be completed, the Richards Building in Currie Street was destroyed by fire, taking with it all 26 proposals.

Although most of the judging had been completed before the fire, suggestions at the time that the committee could use what they had learned from the entrants to propose a new competition with greater clarity as to the requirements led to naught: a 1925 letter to the then Premier John Gunn reveals that there was little to be learned from the competition, as the assessors had found that none of the designs were suitable.

1926 competition

Little progress had been made on the memorial by 1926. While some debate occurred in respect to the form that the memorial would take, the focus of the discussions concerned the location of the memorial, and this centred on the future of Government House and the role of the Governor. A number of left-wing politicians argued that the grounds of Government House should be turned over to the State and used to build the memorial while the conservatives desired to retain the status quo. By 1925 the National War Memorial committee was prepared to accept the Government House grounds as the site of the memorial, but they delayed making an announcement. This proved to be fortuitous, as legal issues prevented the plan from going ahead. Instead a portion of the grounds, located at the corner of North Terrace and Kintore Avenue, was put aside for the purpose. (The plan to move the Governor and to use the grounds as part of a larger war memorial were revisited, over 80 years later, in 2007).

In 1926, after pressure from the returned soldiers, a second competition was announced. Once again the budget was set at £25,000. As per the first competition, all entrants had to be South Australian British subjects, and all entries were to be judged anonymously, but this time there was to be only one assessor: John Smith Murdoch, the chief architect for the Commonwealth of Australia. In deference to the previous competition, the top five entrants from 1924 were each given £75 upon the submission of a new design, and all of the designs were insured by the government for £100 each.

With entries restricted to South Australians, only 18 designs were received—a figure that was "correspondingly fewer" than those received in other states where the competitions were open to all Australians. Nevertheless, in his Assessor's Report, Murdoch acknowledged that the quality of some of the proposals was such that they "probably would not have been exceeded had the competition been more open". After examining the submissions, on 15 January 1927, the design by Louis Laybourne Smith, (one of the principals at the architectural firm Woods, Bagot, Jory & Laybourne–Smith), was selected by Murdoch as the winner.

Woods, Bagot, Jory & Laybourne-Smith had entered the 1924 competition with an arch designed by Walter Bagot, but in 1926 Bagot was away in Europe. Thus Laybourne-Smith was responsible for drawing and submitting the final design, although he was clear to highlight the role Bagot played in the "architectural conception" of the monument. While the firm was to be awarded 6% of the cost of the memorial, they refused all but enough to cover their own expenses, asking instead that residues (approximately £1000) be placed in a trust fund to pay for the upkeep of the work. While this is seen as an altruistic act, Richardson noted that Laybourne-Smith was both a member of the National War Committee and sat on the sub-committee which drafted the rules of the competition, and thus it may have been considered "improper" to accept the money.

When announced to the public the design was "universally hailed as a masterpiece". Nevertheless, in writing his report on the result of the judging, Murdoch stated of the winning architect that he "depends almost entirely on the sculptor to tell the story of the memorial, employing in his design no more architecture than that required to successfully frame and set his sculptural subjects, and to provide accommodation to the extent asked for by the conditions". This view was echoed by Inglis, who described the architecture as "essentially a frame for statuary"—an approach that he felt was "unusual" for an architect. As a result of this dependency on the sculpture, some of the other contestants expressed concerns, arguing that the contest was about architectural works rather than sculptural ones, even though the conditions of the competition specifically allowed for sculpture in the proposals.

Construction

Construction of the memorial began in 1928 with the cut and placement of marble blocks from Macclesfield and Angaston. The South Australian Monumental Works were chosen to work on the construction, with Alan Tillett as the principal. Although no sculptor was named in the winning proposal, it did make mention of a possible candidate—who later proved to be Rayner Hoff, a Sydney-based sculptor born in England. Rayner Hoff produced the designs for the sculptures from his Sydney studio, with the bronze castings from Hoff's plaster models being produced by the South Australian firm A. W. Dobbie and Company. (Hoff had expressed reservations that a South Australian company would be capable of handling bronzes of the required size, but a test casting of the lion's head from the memorial was sufficient to overcome his concerns). The two angel reliefs sculpted from the Angaston marble were produced by Julius Henschke in situ from Hoff's designs, expressed through one-third sized plaster models which Henschke then scaled to suit.

Significant delays occurred during construction after a strike by the stonemasons. The stonemasons were demanding a 44-hour week and to be paid at "outside rates", (rates of pay for stonemasons were based on whether or not the work was to be constructed on site in the open air, or inside under cover— Tillett was paying the lower "inside rates", even though most of the work was to be conducted on the site). However, Tillett had tendered on the basis of a 48-hour week at inside rates, and paying extra would have caused significant financial problems. Tillett eventually won after the dispute went before the courts, but the strike had caused considerable financial damage to Tillett's company, which went into receivership in 1930 and stayed in that state until after the memorial was completed.

The South Australian Government had dedicated £25,000 for the memorial. It was estimated that bulk of the expense would be masonry at £15,300 with sculptural work and landscaping requiring £8,500 and £1,200 respectively. However, the final cost of construction pushed this out to approximately £30,000.

Opening
The National War Memorial in South Australia became the fourth state World War I memorial to be opened when it was unveiled in 1931. Inglis notes that this is in keeping with the size of the constituency, arguing that "[t]he larger the constituency that each of these collective tributes had to represent, the later it was built". It was unveiled before a crowd of almost 75,000 on Anzac Day, 25 April 1931, (the 16th anniversary of the Gallipoli landing), by the Governor Sir Alexander Hore-Ruthven. The crowd, "as huge a crowd as anyone could remember assembling in the city", was unable to fit in front of the memorial, so many thousands assembled at the Cross of Sacrifice in Pennington Gardens to await a later ceremony. Hore-Ruthven was introduced by the acting state premier, Bill Denny MC, whose involvement in the unveiling, according to Inglis, was unusual for a Labor politician.

Commemorative activities
The first dawn service to be conducted at the memorial was held on Anzac Day 1935, and was attended by 200–300 people.

Restoration work
In 2001, the memorial's 70th anniversary year, a three-month remedial project was undertaken, restoring the bronze and stonework details and reinforcing the foundations. The work was completed just days before the Remembrance Day services. In 2002 the architects responsible for the restoration, Bruce Harry & Associates, were awarded a Heritage merit award for their work on the memorial by the Royal Australian Institute of Architects.

Design

The rules of the competition limited the space for the memorial to the "one half acre" of land that was excised from the grounds of Government House. The design submitted by Woods, Bagot, Jory & Laybourne Smith easily met this requirement, as the memorial was designed to fit on an ellipse with a major axis of 18.3 m (60 ft) in length and a minor axis of 15.5 m (51 ft). Standing at a height of over 14 m (46 ft), the structure was carefully placed back from North Terrace to provide space for "public gatherings of a ceremonial nature" and to allow for the proposed widening of the street.

The monument has two sides, referred to by the architects as the reverse and the obverse of the work, which they likened to the two sides of a coin. These two aspects represent the prologue and the epilogue of war. Each side features a relief carved from Angaston marble and framed by the "rough-hewn" arch carved out of marble from Macclesfield, while the granite steps leading up to the monument are constructed of Harcourt granite, as specified in the original proposal. (The architects had preferred the local West Island granite, but acknowledged that the Harcourt granite was "the best available" unless the government would agree to reopen the quarry on West Island). The materials were chosen in order to provide continuity with Parliament House, located a short distance away along North Terrace.

To represent the prologue to the war, the obverse of the monument (the side facing North Terrace) features a relief of the Spirit of Duty appearing as a vision before the youth of South Australia, represented in the work by a sculptural group consisting of a girl, a student and a farmer abandoning the "symbols of their craft". The three are depicted in normal dress, as they are not yet soldiers and are currently unprepared for the war that is to come, and they are facing away from the world as they look to the vision before them. In Bagot's original plan, submitted for the 1924 competition, there was to be but a single nude figure kneeling before the vision (for which Bagot posed while in Europe), but Laybourne-Smith's 1926 submission became grander in its scope. In addition, Bagot's original designs were naturalistic, with the Spirit of Duty depicted as a female figure, but under Hoff's direction the figure was changed to male, and the style of the reliefs was changed to Art Deco—a "radically new" art style for Australia at the time. Hoff, however, presented the sculptural group in the original naturalistic style, thus providing a "bridge between the Renaissance-style architecture and the Art Deco of the reliefs".

On the reverse side of the monument, facing away from the traffic, is a relief carved into the marble representing the epilogue of the war and depicting the Spirit of Compassion as a winged spirit of womanhood bearing aloft a stricken youth. Beneath the figure is situated the Fountain of Compassion, the flow of water representing the "constant flow of memories", while the lion's head from which it emerges, (and which bears the Imperial Crown), is representative of the British Commonwealth of Nations.

The designers acknowledged that the symbolism—especially that of the reverse side—does not represent "victory" in the traditional sense. They stated that the "Arch of Triumph which was built in honour of a Caesar, a Napoleon, no longer expresses the feelings of modern democracy after an international struggle". Instead, the memorial represented a spiritual victory, in which was displayed a "willingness to serve and to sacrifice".

Within the memorial the architects added an inner shrine, or Record Room, in which could be recorded the names of the South Australians who fell during the war. While the design did not specify the exact form that this would take, in the completed memorial these names are inscribed in the bronzes that line the walls. The design also allowed for a cenotaph within the inner shrine, which the designers suggested could either be used as a symbolic representation of the unknown soldier or as the marker to an actual grave, although this aspect was never realised.

The monument is designed to honour both the war dead and all who served in the war—one face being inscribed to those who died in the war, while the other is dedicated to "all who served". On the obverse side is inscribed the words "To perpetuate the courage, loyalty, and sacrifice of those who served in the Great War 1914–1918", while the reverse states "All honour give to those who, nobly striving, nobly fell that we might live". Above the two entrances to the inner shrine were to be inscribed the names of the major theaters in which Australians served in the Great War. Originally it was suggested that this was to be Egypt, Gallipoli and Palestine on one side, with France on the other, but in the final work Belgium was added to the list.

Although the central square mile of the City of Adelaide is designed to the points of the compass, the monument sits at a 45-degree angle to North Terrace. The architects provided two reasons for this. First, it was observed that "monuments suffer materially from monotonous lighting" when they face to the south; and second, the placing of the monument to face a north-west direction allows it to be in line with both the Cross of Sacrifice and St. Peter's Cathedral. In addition to these two arguments, Richardson also notes that the diagonal positioning of the memorial permits the dawn sun to fall on the facade.

Adjacent memorials
Although the National War Memorial was initially proposed as a memorial to those who served in "The Great War", the site has since grown to incorporate a number of smaller memorials. These include a memorial to the Battle of Lone Pine; the "French Memorial", which commemorates South Australians who fought and died in France during the first and second World Wars, unveiled in 1993; an honour roll of those who died in World War II; and the "Australian Armed Forces Memorial", encompassing the Malayan Emergency of 1948–1960, the Korean War, the Indonesia–Malaysia confrontation in Borneo, and the Vietnam War. In addition, the wall which surrounds the northern and western sides of the site features the six "Crosses of Memory"—a series of "simple wooden crosses" commemorating the siege of Tobruk from 1941, the 10th, 27th, and 48th Battalions of 1916 and 50th Battalion of 1918.

Memorial to the 8th Division of the Second Australian Imperial Force, unveiled in December 1995.

Memorial to the Battle of Lone Pine. The tree is a descendant of the original Lone Pine.

The Australian Armed Forces Memorial, encompassing actions in South-East Asia and Korea.

Honour roll listing South Australians who died in the Second World War.

Jubilee 150 Walkway plaques honouring recipients of Victoria and George Crosses.

Notes

References

External links

1931 sculptures
Art Deco sculptures and memorials
Buildings and structures completed in 1931
Buildings and structures in Adelaide
Tourist attractions in Adelaide
World War I memorials in Australia
South Australian Heritage Register
Adelaide Park Lands
Monuments and memorials in South Australia